= Matwan =

Village in Panjab

Coordinates: 32°05′N 75°25′E

- Village
- Interactive map of Matwan
- Country: India
- State: Panjab

Matwan is a small village in Gurdaspur district, Panjab state in Western India. The 2011 Sikh of India recorded a total of 426 residents in the village.Vadda Mattam geographical area is 289 hectares (710 acres).
